For nearly the entire history of film production, certain films have been banned by film censorship or review organizations for political or moral reasons or for controversial content, such as homosexuality. Censorship standards vary widely by country, and can vary within an individual country over time due to political or moral change.

Many countries have government-appointed or private commissions to censor and rate productions for film and television exhibition. While it is common for films to be edited to fall into certain rating classifications, this list includes only films that have been explicitly prohibited from public screening. In some countries, films are banned on a wide scale; these are not listed in this table.

Afghanistan

Albania

Arab League

Argentina

Australia

Azerbaijan

Bahrain

Bangladesh

Belgium

Brazil

Bulgaria

Cambodia

Canada

Chile

China

Commonwealth of Independent States

Cuba

Czechoslovakia

Democratic Republic of the Congo

Denmark

Egypt

Fiji

Finland

France

Germany

Ghana

Greece

Hungary

Iceland

India

Indonesia

Iran

Iraq

Ireland

Israel

Italy

Japan

Jordan

Kazakhstan

Kenya

Kuwait

Kyrgyzstan

Lebanon

Malaysia

Maldives

Mexico

Myanmar

Netherlands

New Caledonia

New Zealand

Nigeria

North Korea

Norway

Oman

Organisation of Islamic Cooperation

Pakistan

Papua New Guinea

Paraguay

Philippines

Poland

Portugal

Qatar

Romania

Russia

Samoa

Saudi Arabia

Senegal

Singapore

Solomon Islands

South Africa

South Korea

Spain

Sri Lanka

Sweden

Switzerland

Tajikistan

Tanzania

Taiwan

Thailand

Tunisia

Turkey

Uganda

Ukraine

United Arab Emirates

United Kingdom

United States

Vatican City

Venezuela

Vietnam

Yugoslavia

Zimbabwe

See also
 List of books banned by governments
 List of banned video games
 Streisand effect

Notes

References

External links
 A complete list of Finland's banned films until 1997
 Complete List of movies banned in India
 List of banned films

History of film